The 15th Pan American Games were held in Rio de Janeiro, Brazil from 13 to 29 July 2007.

Results by event

See also
 Suriname at the 2008 Summer Olympics

External links
Rio 2007 Official website

Nations at the 2007 Pan American Games
P
2007